Finishing Becca: A Story about Peggy Shippen and Benedict Arnold, by Ann Rinaldi, is a historical fiction published in 1994. It takes place during the American Revolutionary War.

Novels by Ann Rinaldi
1994 American novels
Novels set during the American Revolutionary War
American historical novels
Children's historical novels
1994 children's books
American young adult novels